is the 39th single by Japanese entertainer Akina Nakamori. Written by Seriko Natsuno and Kazuhiro Hara, the single was released on December 1, 1999, by Gauss Entertainment under the This One label. It was also the third single from her 19th studio album Will. This was Nakamori's final single under Gauss Entertainment.

The single peaked at No. 57 on Oricon's weekly singles chart and sold over 4,600 copies, becoming Nakamori's first single to sell less than 10,000 copies.

Track listing 
All lyrics are written by Seriko Natsuno; all music is arranged by Ikuro Fujiwara.

Charts

References

External links 
 
 

1999 singles
1999 songs
Akina Nakamori songs
Japanese-language songs